Piper kadsura (Japanese pepper) is an East Asian species of pepper vine. It belongs to the magnoliid family Piperaceae.

In Japanese, it is known as fūtōkazura (風藤). It only grows in warmer areas, and was used medicinally in the past.

References

kadsura
Taxa named by Jacques Denys Choisy